Figueras is a surname. Notable people with the surname include:

Josep Figueras (born 1963), Spanish health policy researcher
Alfons Figueras (1922–2009), Spanish cartoonist
Amanda Figueras (born 1978), Spanish journalist
Estanislao Figueras (1819–1882), Spanish politician
Giuliano Figueras (born 1976), Italian cyclist
Jordi Figueras Montel (born 1987), Spanish footballer
José Juan Figueras (born 1979), Spanish footballer
Marcelo Figueras (born 1962), Argentine writer and screenwriter
Montserrat Figueras (1942–2011), Spanish opera singer
Nacho Figueras (born 1977), Argentine polo player
Orlando Figuera (1996–2017), Venezuelan killed during the 2017 protests
Angela Yoriko Figueras (born 1966), Japanese-Filipino-Spanish Beauty Queen and businesswoman

Spanish-language surnames